The Municipal District of Smoky River No. 130 is a municipal district (MD) in northwestern Alberta, Canada. Located in Census Division No. 19, its municipal office is located in the Town of Falher.

History 
On January 1, 1952, its name was changed from MD of Fillion No. 130 to its current name, which was taken from Smoky River, a tributary of Peace River.

Geography

Communities and localities 
 
The following urban municipalities are surrounded by the MD of Smoky River No. 130.
Cities
none
Towns
Falher
McLennan
Villages
Donnelly
Girouxville
Summer villages
none

The following hamlets are located within the MD of Smoky River No. 130.
Hamlets
Guy
Jean Cote

The following localities are located within the MD of Smoky River No. 130.
Localities 
Ballater
Crowell
Culp
Dreau
Forest View
Kathleen
Lac Magloire
Little Smoky
Normandville
Roxana
Whitemud Creek
Winagami

Demographics 

In the 2016 Census of Population conducted by Statistics Canada, the MD of Smoky River No. 130 had a population of 2,023 living in 720 of its 891 total private dwellings, a  change from its 2011 population of 2,126.

See also 
 List of communities in Alberta
 List of municipal districts in Alberta

References

External links 
 

 
Smoky River